Nellie Elizabeth Robinson  (1915 – 19 September 1992) was the first female mayor in Queensland, Australia. She was elected mayor of the City of Toowoomba in 1967.

Early life
Nellie Robinson was born in Toowoomba.

Political career 
Robinson was elected as an Alderman to the Toowoomba City Council in 1961 and was elected Queensland's first female mayor in 1967. In the 1972 Queensland state election she was a candidate for the Country Party in the seat of Toowoomba North but was unsuccessful. In 1979, she was made an officer of the Order of the British Empire for "distinguished service to local government".

Later life
Nellie Robinson retired in 1981 because of ill health and died on 19 September 1992. Robinson is buried in the Drayton and Toowoomba Cemetery.

Legacy 
In her will, Robinson bequeathed twenty thousand dollars to the Toowoomba Council for the Robinson collection of historic memorabilia held in the local history library in Toowoomba.

See also
 List of mayors of Toowoomba

References 

Mayors of Toowoomba
1915 births
1992 deaths
20th-century Australian politicians
Australian Officers of the Order of the British Empire
Women mayors of places in Queensland
Women local councillors in Australia
Queensland local councillors